The Butterfield Claims refers to a 19th-century maritime dispute between the United States and Denmark.

In 1854, six ships belonging to Carlos Butterfield & Co., loaded with war material, cleared at New York for St. Thomas. Suspicion arose that they were destined for the rebels of Venezuela. However, due to evidence, they were cleared in a libel suit.

After arriving in the Danish West Indies, trouble again arose because of their suspicious character. The owners presented a large claim for damages because the vessels were detained by the Danish government. Thirty-four years of negotiations ended in a Danish-American arbitration treaty in 1888, as a result of which the claim was disallowed on the ground that the Danish government had observed strictly the neutrality laws involved.

See also
Sir Edmund Monson, arbitrator between an American shipping company and the government of Denmark (1888)

References

 Dictionary of American History by James Truslow Adams, New York: Charles Scribner's Sons, 1940

Law of war
History of the foreign relations of the United States
Arbitration cases
1854 in international relations
1888 in international relations
Denmark–United States relations
19th century in the Danish West Indies